Lufingo is an administrative ward in the Rungwe district of the Mbeya Region of Tanzania.

In 2016 the Tanzania National Bureau of Statistics report there were 12,286 people in the ward, from 17,166 in 2012 before it was split up.

Villages and hamlets 
The ward has 4 villages, and 22 hamlets.

 Itete
 Bujonde
 Itete
 Kasanda
 Lufingo
 Mbanganyigale
 Kagwina
 Kandete
 Lumbila
 Masebe
 Soweto
 kagwina
 Kalalo
 Bujinga
 Busango
 Igembe
 Kalalo
 Katumba
 Simike
 Ibabu
 Ipyana
 Itebe
 Kakuyu
 Kasanga
 Majombo
 Malibila

References 

Wards of Mbeya Region